Mutena Airport  is an airport serving the town of Mutena in Kasaï Province, Democratic Republic of the Congo.

See also

Transport in the Democratic Republic of the Congo
List of airports in the Democratic Republic of the Congo

References

External links
 Mutena Airport
 HERE Maps - Mutena
 OpenStreetMap - Mutena
 OurAirports - Mutena

Airports in Kasaï Province